The Gulf, Mobile and Ohio Passenger Terminal is a historic train station in Mobile, Alabama, United States.  Architect P. Thornton Marye designed the Mission Revival style terminal for the Mobile and Ohio Railroad.  It was completed in 1907 at a total cost of $575,000.  The Mobile and Ohio merged with the Gulf, Mobile and Northern Railroad in 1940 to form the Gulf, Mobile and Ohio Railroad.

Trains in final years
Major trains served:
Gulf, Mobile & Ohio:
Gulf Coast Rebel: St. Louis, Missouri - Mobile
Southern Railway:
Goldenrod: Birmingham, Alabama - Mobile

Demise
The last GM&O passenger trains into Mobile terminal station were the Gulf Coast Rebels, which made their last runs on October 14, 1958.  Louisville & Nashville passenger service in Mobile called at a separate L&N station located about 1 mile distant.  Passenger service in the Amtrak era continued at the former L&N passenger station Mobile station. GM&O Terminal Station continued to serve as railroad offices. It was placed on the National Register of Historic Places on August 15, 1975. It had suffered neglect, extensive interior alteration, and partial removal of the train shed by this time. The Gulf, Mobile and Ohio Railroad vacated the old terminal building in 1986 and for fifteen years it suffered from demolition-by-neglect. The Alabama Historical Commission and the Alabama Trust for Historic Preservation named it as one of their "Places in Peril" in 1996. In 2001 the City of Mobile and a private company invested more than $18 million to restore the local landmark with the developer taking advantage of the Federal Historic Preservation Tax Incentive program. Today the building houses private offices and the city's The Wave Transit System. The renovated facility was extensively damaged by flooding during Hurricane Katrina.

See also
Mobile station (Amtrak)

References

Mobile
National Register of Historic Places in Mobile, Alabama
Buildings and structures in Mobile, Alabama
Transportation in Mobile, Alabama
Former railway stations in Alabama
Railway stations on the National Register of Historic Places in Alabama
Railway stations in the United States opened in 1907
Spanish Revival architecture in Alabama
Spanish Colonial Revival architecture in Alabama
Transportation buildings and structures in Mobile County, Alabama
Repurposed railway stations in the United States